Teodorowo may refer to the following places:
Teodorowo, Lipno County in Kuyavian-Pomeranian Voivodeship (north-central Poland)
Teodorowo, Radziejów County in Kuyavian-Pomeranian Voivodeship (north-central Poland)
Teodorowo, Ostrołęka County in Masovian Voivodeship (east-central Poland)
Teodorowo, Płock County in Masovian Voivodeship (east-central Poland)
Teodorowo, Greater Poland Voivodeship (west-central Poland)